Mamadou "Bebeto" Zongo (born 8 October 1980) is a Burkinabé football coach and former player who played as a striker.

Club career
Zongo was born in Bobo-Dioulasso. He signed on a free transfer for Romanian club U Cluj in November 2007 and had a salary of $9,000 per month. After two matches, he was released by the club board in December 2007, on account of a recurring knee injury. In October 2010, he signed a new contract for ASFA Yennega of Burkina Faso and spent the last two years of his playing career with the club.

International career
Zongo was part of the Burkina Faso national team at the 2000 African Nations Cup which finished bottom of group C in the first round of competition, thus failing to secure qualification for the quarter-finals. He earned 30 caps and 13 goals.

Coaching career
In April 2013, Zongo became a head coach of the Burkinabé side Santos.

He was appointed head coach of ASFB in 2015.

Honours
RC Bobo
 Burkinabé Premier League: 1996

ASEC Mimosas
 Côte d'Ivoire Premier Division: 1997
 Côte d'Ivoire Cup: 1997

References

External links
 
 
 
 Voetbal International

1980 births
Living people
People from Bobo-Dioulasso
Burkinabé footballers
Association football forwards
Burkina Faso international footballers
2000 African Cup of Nations players
Eredivisie players
Liga I players
De Graafschap players
SBV Vitesse players
VVV-Venlo players
Ethnikos Piraeus F.C. players
FC Universitatea Cluj players
ASEC Mimosas players
RC Bobo Dioulasso players
ASFA Yennenga players
Burkinabé football managers
ASF Bobo Dioulasso managers
Burkinabé expatriate footballers
Burkinabé expatriate sportspeople in the Netherlands
Expatriate footballers in the Netherlands
Burkinabé expatriate sportspeople in Greece
Expatriate footballers in Greece
Burkinabé expatriate sportspeople in Romania
Expatriate footballers in Romania
Burkinabé expatriate sportspeople in Ivory Coast
Expatriate footballers in Ivory Coast
21st-century Burkinabé people